|}

This is a list of electoral division results for the Northern Territory 1983 General Election in Australia.

Results by electoral division

Arafura

Araluen 

 Two candidate preferred vote is estimated.

Arnhem

Barkly

Berrimah

Braitling

Casuarina

Elsey

Fannie Bay

Flynn

Jingili

Koolpinyah

Leanyer

Ludmilla

Macdonnell

Millner

Nhulunbuy

Nightcliff 

 Two candidate preferred vote is estimated.

Port Darwin

Sadadeen

Sanderson

Stuart

Victoria River

Wagaman

Wanguri

See also 

 1983 Northern Territory general election
 Members of the Northern Territory Legislative Assembly, 1983–1987

References 

Results of Northern Territory elections